Berlijn may refer to:

 the Dutch name for Berlin, the capital city, a municipality, and a state in Germany.
 Dick Berlijn (1950), a Dutch general
 Berlijn, Suriname, a village